The Boy with No Name is the fifth studio album by Scottish rock band Travis. The album was released on 7 May 2007 through Epic Records. This is Travis first album in which other members contributed to songwriting, rather than the frontman Fran Healy, who was the sole songwriter across their past four albums. The album sold over 442,900 copies worldwide.

Background
The name of the album came about when lead singer Fran Healy and his partner Nora were deciding on a name for their newly born son. During this time, he sent a photo of his son to a friend by email and labeled the photo "The Boy with No Name". Healy revealed this on The Chris Moyles Show during an interview. Healy has also revealed in pre-album release performances that some tracks are influenced by his developing family status, such as "My Eyes" being about his new son or "Battleships" referring to ups and downs of relationships.

Travis dedicated this album to the Abbey Road Studios chief master engineer Chris Blair and British world champion rally driver Richard Burns, who died of a brain tumour at the age of 34 in 2005.

During the recording, the band discovered they were in the same studio as British band Feeder but in different rooms. (Feeder were recording what would be their fifth studio album Pushing the Senses.) It occurred to Fran and Dougie they should help Feeder with their album and provided backing vocals for the final chorus of the first single, "Tumble and Fall".

For the track "Under the Moonlight", backing vocals were recorded by singer-songwriter KT Tunstall, and "Battleships" features backing vocals by Julia Stone.

Release
The Boy with No Name entered at No. 4 on the UK Album Charts. In the U.S., the album debuted at number 58 on the Billboard 200, selling 12,000 copies in its first week. The album went gold in the UK. "Closer" was released as the first single from the album in the United Kingdom on 23 April 2007, and peaked at No. 10 in the UK Singles Chart (see 2007 in British music). Second single "Selfish Jean" made No. 30. The final single, "My Eyes", reached No. 60 – their lowest chart placing during their career at the time. The full album was available to purchase at the Virgin Megastore at the Coachella Valley Music and Arts Festival in California over the weekend of 27 April 2007 – 29 April 2007.

Reception

The Boy with No Name received mixed reviews from music critics. At Metacritic, which assigns a normalised rating out of 100 to reviews from mainstream critics, the album received an average score of 57 based on 20 reviews, which indicates "mixed or average reviews". NME gave the album 2 out of 10 and labelled it "impotent aural gruel" with "all the soul of a platform announcement".

Track listing

Personnel
Personnel per booklet.

Travis
 Fran Healy – lead vocals, guitar, harmonica, piano
 Andy Dunlop – guitar
 Dougie Payne – bass guitar, backing vocals
 Neil Primrose – drums

Production
 Travis – producer (except track 13) 
 Steve Orchard – producer (except tracks 2, 6, 8, 10 and 13), engineering (except tracks 8 and 13) 
 Mike Hedges – producer (tracks 2 and 6), vocal recordings (tracks 3, 5, 7, 10 and 11)
 George Tandero – producer and engineer (track 8), mixing (tracks 4, 5 and 8)
 Nigel Godrich – additional production (tracks 3, 5, 7 and 10), engineering (track 13)
 Matthieu Clouard – production assistant (tracks 2 and 6), vocal recordings (tracks 3, 7, 10 and 11)
 Jens L Thomsen – assistant engineer (track 8)
 Michael H. Brauer – mixing (except tracks 4, 5 and 8)
 Will Hensley – mix assistant (except tracks 4 and 5)
 Emery Dobyns – Washington Square Park recording (track 12)
 Tappin Gofton – design and art direction 
 Stefan Ruiz – photography

Additional musicians
 Julia Stone – backing vocals (track 5)
 KT Tunstall – backing vocals (track 9)
 Manon Morris – harp (track 11)
 Sarah Clarke – clarinet (track 12)
 Joby Talbot – string arrangement (track 2)
 Chris Worsey – cello (track 2)
 Ian Burdge – cello (tracks 2, 3, 5 and 7)
 Zoe Martlew – cello (track 2)
 Lucy Wilkins – violin (track 2)
 Louisa Fuller – violin (track 2)
 Helena Wood – violin (track 2)
 Rick Koster – violin (track 2)
 Richard George – violin (track 2)
 Louisa Aldridge – violin (track 2)
 Jonathan Hill – violin (track 2)
 Darragh Morgan – violin (track 2)
 Jeff Moore – violin (track 2)
 Natalia Bonner – violin (track 2)
 Adrian Smith – viola (track 2)
 Reiad Chibah – viola (track 2)
 John Metcalfe – viola (tracks 2, 3 and 7)
 Rachel Robson – viola (track 2)
 Sally Herbert – string arrangement and violin (tracks 3, 5 and 7)
 Everton Nelson – violin (tracks 3 and 7)
 Calina De La Mare – violin (track 5)
 Oli Langford – viola (track 5)

Charts

References

2007 albums
Travis (band) albums
Epic Records albums
Independiente Records albums
Albums produced by Nigel Godrich
Albums recorded at RAK Studios